Alex Antonitsch was the defending champion, but he lost in the quarterfinals this year.

Patrick Baur won the tournament, beating Jeff Tarango in the final, 6–4, 1–6, 7–6(7–5).

Seeds

Draw

Finals

Top half

Bottom half

References

 Main Draw

Seoul Open
1991 ATP Tour
1991 Seoul Open